Pseudomedaeus is a genus of crabs in the family Xanthidae, containing the following species:

 Pseudomedaeus africanus (Monod, 1956)
 Pseudomedaeus agassizi (A. Milne Edwards, 1880)
 Pseudomedaeus distinctus (Rathbun, 1898)

References

Xanthoidea